Denis William Pack-Beresford (7 July 1818 – 28 December 1881), known as Denis William Pack until 1854, was an Irish Conservative Party politician.

Early life and family
Pack was the son of decorated military officer Denis Pack and Elizabeth Louisa Beresford. In early life, Pack was a Captain of the Royal Artillery. Upon inheriting estates from his uncle, General William Carr Beresford, in 1854, he also inherited the arms of Beresford, and assumed the additional surname. In 1856, he became a High Sheriff.

Pack-Beresford then married Annette Caroline Browne, daughter of Robert Clayton Browne and Harriette Augusta Hamilton, in 1863. Together, they had nine children:
 Elizabeth Harriet Pack-Beresford (died 1937)
 Annette Louisa Pack-Beresford (died 1941)
 Denis Robert Pack-Beresford (1864–1942)
 Arthur William Pack-Beresford (1868–1902)
 Charles George Pack-Beresford (1869–1914), an officer in the West Kent Regiment.
 Henry John Pack-Beresford (1871–1945), an officer in the Highland Light Infantry
 Reynell James Pack-Beresford (1872–1949)
 Hugh de la Poer Pack-Beresford (1874–1954)
 Algernon Dunbar Pack-Beresford (1875–1908)

Political career
He was elected as one of the two Members of Parliament (MPs) for Carlow County at a by-election in 1862 and held the seat until standing down at the 1868 general election.

Later life
In later life, Pack-Beresford was a Deputy Lieutenant and Justice of the Peace.

Arms

References

External links
 

1818 births
1881 deaths
Irish Conservative Party MPs
Members of the Parliament of the United Kingdom for County Carlow constituencies (1801–1922)
UK MPs 1859–1865
UK MPs 1865–1868
High Sheriffs of Carlow